The Fort Peck Original Houses Historic District, is an  historic district consisting of 12 one-story cottages along E. Kansas Avenue in Fort Peck, Montana.  Some or all was built in 1934, and they served as housing for the administrative personnel from the Army Corps of Engineers during the Fort Peck Dam project.  The district was listed on the National Register of Historic Places in 1986, when all the houses were more than 50 years old.

Ten of the cottages were built by Johnson, Drake, & Piper and two were built by Madsen Const. Co.

References

Historic districts on the National Register of Historic Places in Montana
Buildings and structures completed in 1934
Original Houses Historic District
1934 establishments in Montana
National Register of Historic Places in Valley County, Montana
United States Army Corps of Engineers
Company housing